Mattia Pellegrin (born 8 June 1989) is a former cross-country skier from Italy. He competed for Italy at the 2014 Winter Olympics in the cross country skiing events. He has been in a relationship with cross-country skier Lucia Scardoni since 2011: the couple have lived together in Predazzo since 2013. As of 2018, he had retired from competition and was working as a policeman.

References

External links
 

1989 births
Living people
Olympic cross-country skiers of Italy
Cross-country skiers at the 2014 Winter Olympics
Italian male cross-country skiers
Tour de Ski skiers
Italian police officers
Cross-country skiers of Fiamme Oro